Dejvid Kapllani (born 3 June 2001) is an Albanian professional footballer who plays as a forward for Albanian club Erzeni. His father Xhevahir was a goalkeeper who played for Teuta as well as the Albania national team. His uncle Edmond was a forward who spent the majority of his career in Germany and who also played for the Albania national team.

Career statistics

Club

References

2001 births
Living people
People from Durrës County
People from Durrës
Association football forwards
Albanian footballers
KF Teuta Durrës players
Kategoria Superiore players